Otapy  is a village in the administrative district of Gmina Brańsk, within Bielsk County, Podlaskie Voivodeship, in north-eastern Poland.

According to the 1921 census, the village was inhabited by 3 people Mosaic, declared Polish nationality. There were 1 residential buildings in the village.

References

Otapy